The Shan State Cultural Museum, now known as Cultural Museum (Taunggyi), is a museum located at Bogyoke Aung San Road and Eintawshay Road, in Taunggyi, Shan State, Myanmar (Burma). This museum is one of the cultural museums under the Department of Archaeology and National Museum, Ministry of Religious Affairs and Culture, the Republic of the Union of Myanmar. It was established in 1974. It displays divans, swords, fans, chairs used by Sawbwa (Shan Chief of former times), old paintings, coins and traditional costumes of the Shan races.

History
At first, the institution was organized as the Shan state Cultural Department at the Shan state office and exhibited some cultural objects on 27 June 1956. According to the new administration system of 1974, it was transferred to the Cultural Institute Department and it was inaugurated as the Cultural Museum at the present building on May 11, 1974. So the 60 years old objects are displayed in the over forty years old museum.

Displays
In the Cultural Museum (Taunggyi), 808 display objects are exhibited in the four exhibition rooms and a total of 5998 display objects are in the museum's collection.

It is two storied brick building and the display area is about 11200 square feet. There are four exhibition rooms; exhibition room (1), exhibition room (2), exhibition room (3) and exhibition room (4). Altogether 880 artifacts are being showcased in the exhibition rooms.

Ground floor
In the reception hall, the map of Shan State (10’x10’) is displayed. The Shan State is the largest state existed in the east of Myanmar and it is divided into three parts: east, south and north.

Exhibition room (1) and exhibition room (2) are in the ground floor. In the exhibition room (1), the traditional costumes and the traditional instruments of Shan nationalities are displayed. In Shan State, over 30 Shan nationalities are still living and they have their own different cultures. The Shan nationalities have their intangible cultural heritage such as the traditional arts and crafts. Those arts and crafts such as weaving, lacquer wares, glazed wares and traditional Shan paper are displayed in association with explanatory texts in the exhibition room (2).

First floor
Exhibition room (3) and exhibition room (4) are on the first floor. In the exhibition room (3), it is shown about the Pinlon Agreement, the most important event not only in Shan State but also in the whole Myanmar country. On 12 February 1947, the Pinlon agreement leading by General Aung San had been signed by the leaders of the Nationalities of Myanmar in Pinlon, Shan State due to reveal the desire of all Myanmar nationalities to get the Independence altogether from British. The huge oil painting (5’x8’) illustrated the signing of Pinlon agreement, the copy of Agreement and the photos of the leaders of Nationalities who signed in the agreement, attached with their biography are displayed. Moreover, the colorful paintings illustrated the traditional cultures of nationalities are also displayed.

Exhibition room (4) showcased about the literature of Shan nationality such as palm leaves manuscripts and paper parchments. The photos of the Shan poets are also displayed together with their biography. Besides, it is also displayed to show that the Shan nationalities believe in Buddhism by showcasing the Buddha images made of bronze, wooden, lacquer and clay. And the traditional utensils used in the monasteries for offering the alms food are exhibited. It can reflect that the Shan nationalities deeply believe in the Buddhism. Moreover, the ancient artifacts that can identify the successive periods flourished in the Shan state are exhibited.

References

External links
 https://www.facebook.com/Cultural-Museum-Taunggyi-1922159871331693/

Museums in Myanmar
Buildings and structures in Shan State
Museums established in 1989